The 2018–19 season was Al-Shorta's 45th season in the Iraqi Premier League, having featured in all 44 previous editions of the competition. Al-Shorta participated in the Iraqi Premier League and the Iraq FA Cup.

They entered this season having finished fourth in the league in the 2017–18 season, but under the management of Nebojša Jovović they achieved better results and managed to secure the Iraqi Premier League title on 14 July with three games to spare. They finished five points above closest challenger Al-Quwa Al-Jawiya, thus qualifying for both the 2020 AFC Champions League and 2019–20 Arab Club Champions Cup. In the Iraq FA Cup, Al-Shorta were eliminated in the Round of 16 against Al-Kahrabaa.

Squad
Numbers in parenthesis denote appearances as substitute.

Personnel

Technical Staff

Management

Kit
Supplier: Nike

Transfers

In

Out

Competitions

Iraqi Premier League

Score overview

Note: Al-Shorta goals listed first.

Classification

Results summary

Results by round

Iraq FA Cup

Round of 32

Round of 16

Player statistics

Iraqi Premier League

Iraq FA Cup

References

External links
Al-Shorta website
Al-Shorta TV
Team info at goalzz.com

Al-Shorta SC seasons